Roman Sergeyevich Filippov  (January 24, 1936  —  February 18, 1992) was a Soviet theater and film actor. People's Artist of the RSFSR (1987).

Selected filmography  
 World Champion (1954) as fighter
 Green Van (1959) as Fedka Byk
 The Girls (1961) as Vasya Zaitsev
 Street of the Younger Son (1962) as uncle Yasha
 Beloved (1965) as furniture loader
 The City of Masters (1966) as baron 
 Three Fat Men (1966) as Prospero
 The Diamond Arm (1968) as Ladyzhensky
 Gentlemen of Fortune (1971) as Nikola 
  Drama from Ancient Life (1971) as Prokhor
 Grandads-Robbers (1971) as robber
  Telegram (1971) as episode
 The Twelve Chairs (1971) as  poet Nikifor Lyapis-Trubetskoy
 Earthly Love (1974) as  Baturin
 Destiny (1977) as  Baturin
 Balamut (1978) as  Fedor (Fedya) Paramonov
  Siberiade (1979) as Chernokhvostikov
 At the Beginning of Glorious Days  (1980)  as  Fyodor Romodanovsky
 The Youth of Peter the Great  (1980)  as  Fyodor Romodanovsky 
 Charodei  (1982)  as Modest Matveevich Kamneyedov
 Married Bachelor  (1982)  as  Stepan Kuzmich
 Boris Godunov  (1986)  as   Patriarch Job of Moscow
 Peter the Great   (1986)  as  Danila Menshikov
 Entrance to the Labyrinth   (1989)  as  Nikolai Ignatievich Belavol

References

External links
 

 1936   births
1992 deaths
Actors from Simferopol
Soviet male film actors
Soviet male stage actors
Soviet male voice actors
Soviet male television actors
People's Artists of the RSFSR
Burials in Troyekurovskoye Cemetery
20th-century Russian male actors